Filicerozaena is a genus of beetles in the family Carabidae, containing the following species:

 Filicerozaena bravoi Deuve, 2004 
 Filicerozaena callangaensis Deuve, 2005 
 Filicerozaena chiriboga Deuve, 2004 
 Filicerozaena cosangaensis Deuve, 2005 
 Filicerozaena flava Deuve, 2004 
 Filicerozaena leleuporum Deuve, 2005 
 Filicerozaena losi Deuve, 2005 
 Filicerozaena moreti Deuve, 2001 
 Filicerozaena tagliantii Deuve, 2005 
 Filicerozaena toureti Deuve, 2004

References

Paussinae